

This is a list of the National Register of Historic Places listings in Greenville County, South Carolina outside the city of Greenville.

This is intended to be a complete list of the properties and districts on the National Register of Historic Places in Greenville County, South Carolina, United States. The locations of National Register properties and districts for which the latitude and longitude coordinates are included below, may be seen in a map.

There are 91 properties and districts listed on the National Register in the county. Listings in the city of Greenville are listed separately, while the 46 properties and districts in the remaining parts of the county are listed here. Another property in Greenville County outside Greenville was once listed but has been removed.

Current listings

|}

Former listing

|}

See also

List of National Historic Landmarks in South Carolina
National Register of Historic Places listings in South Carolina

References

Greenville County